Gaash or Ga'ash may refer to:
Ga'ash, a kibbutz in Israel
Mount Gaash, a hill in ancient Israel